A gryphon, or griffin, is a mythological creature with the body of a lion and head and wings of an eagle.

Gryphon may also refer to:

Arts, entertainment and media
 Gryphon (band), a British progressive rock band
 Gryphon (album), 1973
 Gryphon (film), a 2007 TV film
 Gryphon, a 1990 installment of the TV anthology series WonderWorks
 Gryphon (Alice's Adventures in Wonderland), a fictional character
 The Gryphon, formerly Leeds Student, is a British weekly student newspaper

Businesses and organisations
 Gryphon Airlines, an American airline
 Gryphon Audio Designs, a Danish maker of audio equipment
 Gryphon Publications, an American independent publishing company
 The Gryphon School, in Sherborne, Dorset, England

Other uses
 Gryphon (geology), a mud volcano
 Gryphon (parachute system), a military parachute system
 BGM-109G Ground Launched Cruise Missile, or Gryphon, an American cruise missile
 6136 Gryphon, an asteroid

See also

 Griffin (disambiguation)
 Griffon (disambiguation)
 Gryphon Software Morph, software